In theoretical computer science, a Turing machine is a theoretical machine that is used in thought experiments to examine the abilities and limitations of computers. An unambiguous Turing machine is a special kind of non-deterministic Turing machine, which, in some sense, is similar to a deterministic Turing machine.

Formal definition 
A non-deterministic Turing machine is represented formally by a 6-tuple, as explained in the page non-deterministic Turing machine.
An unambiguous Turing machine is a non-deterministic Turing machine such that, for every input , there exists at most one sequence of configurations  with the following conditions:
  is the initial configuration with input 
  is an accepting configuration.

 Expressivity 

Every deterministic Turing machine is an unambiguous Turing machine, as for each input, there is exactly one computation possible.
Unambiguous Turing machines have the same expressivity as a Turing machines. They are a subset of non-deterministic Turing machines, which have the same expressivity as Turing machines.

On the other hand, unambiguous non-deterministic polynomial time is suspected to be strictly less expressive than (potentially ambiguous) non-deterministic polynomial time.

 References 
Lane A. Hemaspaandra and Jorg Rothe, Unambiguous Computation: Boolean Hierarchies and Sparse Turing-Complete Sets'', SIAM J. Comput., 26(3), 634–653

Turing machine